"Bounce" is Tarkan's debut English language single. It was released in Turkey, his home nation, on 25 October 2005, before being released in Germany on 24 March 2006.

Domestic Release
 Bounce, 2005 / 2006
 Bounce (Orıgınal) (3:43)
 Bounce (Pacifique) (3:44)
 Bounce (Ozinga) (3:40)
 Shhh (DkEvrim Mix) (3:50)
 Bounce (Kerim & DkEvrım) (4:20)
 Shhh (3:35)
 Bounce (N.Y.L.A.) (3:45)
 Bounce (Pacifique De Replay Remix)
 Bounce (Beathoavenz Cut)
 Bounce (Don Candiani Reggaeton Rmx feat. Adassa)
 Bounce (Oriental Mix)
 Bounce (Indu Mix)
 Bounce (Original Mix)
 Bounce (Armand Van Helden Mix)
 Bounce (DJ Fuma's Elastic Mix)

Extra information 12-inch Releases

Along with a promotional vinyl release of the single, there were three 12" versions released for promotional use/club DJs, too.

Charts

Weekly charts

Year-end charts

References

External links
 Tarkan.com
 Juno Records

2005 singles
Tarkan (singer) songs
Songs written by Tarkan (singer)
English-language Turkish songs
2005 songs
Songs written by Devrim Karaoglu